BidAir Cargo is a wholly owned subsidiary of the Bidvest Group Limited, an international investment company. Was previously part of the BidAir Services group, a division of Bidvest that handles cargo in Africa. In 2014, BidAir bought and merged with Imperial Air Cargo.

Destinations 
As of January 2021, BidAir Cargo serves 37 destinations in Southern and Eastern Africa as well as on Mauritius and the Comoros:

Lubumbashi - Lubumbashi International Airport

Nairobi - Jomo Kenyatta International Airport
Mombasa - Moi International Airport

Windhoek - Hosea Kutako International Airport

Mauritius - Sir Seewoosagur Ramgoolam International Airport

Kigali - Kigali International Airport

Cape Town - Cape Town International Airport
Durban - King Shaka International Airport
East London - East London Airport
George - George Airport
Johannesburg:
OR Tambo International Airport Hub
Lanseria International Airport
Port Elizabeth - Port Elizabeth Airport

Juba - Juba Airport

Dar Es Salaam - Julius Nyerere International Airport
Zanzibar - Zanzibar International Airport
Mwanza - Mwanza Airport

Entebbe - Entebbe International Airport

Lusaka - Lusaka International Airport
Livingstone - Livingstone Airport
Ndola - Ndola Airport

Harare - Harare International Airport
Victoria Falls - Victoria Falls Airport

Fleet 
As of January 2021, the BidAir Cargo fleet consists of the following aircraft:

References

External links 
Official website

Airlines of South Africa